Rufford, in Nottinghamshire, is the site of two villages whose inhabitants were evicted in the 12th century. Cistercian monasteries were established and the monks wished to ensure their isolation.

The village features Rufford Abbey, a large country estate. Rufford Mill Ford, is located in the village.

See also 
 Rufford Abbey

References 

Former populated places in Nottinghamshire
Forcibly depopulated communities in the United Kingdom